Pessoa may refer to:

People with the surname
Andy Pessoa (born 1995), American actor
Ciro Pessoa (born 1957), Brazilian musician
Epitácio Pessoa (1865–1942), Brazilian politician and jurist
Fernando Pessoa (1888–1935), Portuguese poet and writer
João Pessoa Cavalcanti de Albuquerque (1878–1930), Brazilian politician and jurist
Nelson Pessoa (born 1935), Brazilian equestrian
Raphael Luz Pessoa (born 1989), Brazilian footballer
Regina Pessoa (born 1969), Portuguese animator
Ricardo Jorge Rodrigues Pessoa (born 1982), Portuguese footballer
Rodrigo Pessoa (born 1972), Brazilian Olympic equestrian

Other uses
 "Pessoa", a song by Momus from the album Scobberlotchers
 Pessoa Prize, a Portuguese science, arts and literature award
 Pessoa (magazine), Brazilian online literary magazine 
 João Pessoa, Paraíba, the capital city of the state of Paraíba in Brazil